Adda Dari is a 1968 Indian Kannada film written, directed and produced by Hunsur Krishnamurthy.  The film has musical score by Rajan–Nagendra.

Cast

 B. M. Venkatesh
 Dwarakish
 Lokesh
 Rama
 Sathyavathi
 Janaki
 Hunsur Krishnamurthy
 Rajanand

Soundtrack

References

External links
 

1968 films
1960s Kannada-language films
Films scored by Rajan–Nagendra
Films directed by Hunsur Krishnamurthy